Enoch Edwards may refer to:
 Enoch Edwards (trade unionist)
 Enoch Edwards (surgeon)